The Roman Catholic Diocese of Malang is a diocese located in the city of Malang in the Ecclesiastical province of Semarang in Indonesia.

History
 April 27, 1927: Established as Apostolic Prefecture of Malang, on  territory split off from the then Apostolic Vicariate of Batavia
 March 15, 1939: Promoted as Apostolic Vicariate of Malang
 January 3, 1961: Promoted as Diocese of Malang

Leadership
 Bishops of Malang (Roman rite)
 Bishop Henricus Pidyarto Gunawan, O. Carm. (June 28, 2016 – present)
 Bishop Herman Joseph Sahadat Pandoyoputro, O. Carm. (May 15, 1989 – June 28, 2016)
 Bishop Francis Xavier Sudartanta Hadisumarta, O. Carm. (March 1, 1973 – May 5, 1988)
 Bishop Antoine Everardo Giovanni Albers, O. Carm. (January 3, 1961 – March 1, 1973)
 Vicars Apostolic of Malang (Roman Rite) 
 Bishop Antoine Everardo Giovanni Albers, O. Carm. (March 15, 1939 – January 3, 1961)
 Prefects Apostolic of Malang (Roman Rite) 
 Fr. Antoine Everardo Giovanni Albers, O. Carm. (later Bishop) (January 28, 1935 – March 15, 1939)
 Fr. Clemente van der Pas, O. Carm. (July 19, 1927 – 1935)

References
 GCatholic.org
 Catholic Hierarchy

Roman Catholic dioceses in Indonesia
Christian organizations established in 1927
Roman Catholic Diocese of Malang
Roman Catholic dioceses and prelatures established in the 20th century